The Chelsea Inn is a historic hotel and pub, founded in 1858 in Atlantic City, New Jersey. The structure has been a part of the Atlantic City's landscape since 1880. The building was formerly Grossman's Kosher Hotel.

Erroneous Closing Report
A post by the Inn's Facebook page reported that the establishment closed abruptly in July 2017, however those initial reports were erroneous. A spokesperson for the Inn, said that only the pub has been closed. The hotel and a separate food service remain operational.

References

External links 

Hotels in Atlantic City, New Jersey
Hotel buildings completed in 1880
Restaurants in New Jersey
Restaurants established in 1858
1858 establishments in New Jersey
Victorian architecture in New Jersey